The mimic tree frog ("Hyla" imitator) is a species of frog in the family Hylidae that is endemic to the central Amazon of Brazil. The species is virtually unknown. The genus format, as used by the American Museum of Natural History's Amphibian Species of the World, indicates that while this species is temporarily kept in Hyla, it belongs elsewhere and will be reassigned pending a taxonomic resolution.

References

Hyla
Amphibians of Brazil
Endemic fauna of Brazil
Frogs of South America
Amphibians described in 1921
Taxonomy articles created by Polbot